Cecilie Hauståker Fiskerstrand (born 20 March 1996) is a Norwegian footballer who plays as a goalkeeper for LSK Kvinner of the Norwegian Toppserien and for Norway.

Fiskerstrand got a rupture in one of the cruciate ligaments in the knee during a training 11 May 2022. She will therefore not be able to play the rest of the 2022 season in Toppserien or participate in the Euro 2022.

Club career
Fiskerstrand began her career in Langevåg. In 2014, she moved to the second division club Fortuna Ålesund, where she first played in the U-19 team and then also for the senior team. In the same year, she moved to toppserien club Stabæk. In November 2015 Fiskerstrand transferred from Stabæk to reigning champions LSK Kvinner FK.

Fiskerstand signed a one-and-a-half-year contract with Birghton in January 2020. She stayed there until the end of the contract, but decided to leave after that due to a lack of playing time. In totalt, she got 7 matches for the club, all in the 2019-2020 season. In her debut match, she kept a clean sheet. And after her second match, which was against Chelsea, she was awarded a place on on the team of the round for her performance.

She returned to LSK Kvinner in June 2021.

International career
On 17 January 2014, she earned her first international cap in senior team in a match against England in La Manga, Spain. She earned a second cap only almost a year later, again in La Manga when she came off the bench replacing the veteran Ingrid Hjelmseth, on 15 January 2015. She was then called for the 2015 Algarve Cup. In May 2015, she was nominated as the youngest Norwegian player for the 2015 FIFA Women's World Cup.

References

External links
 
 NFF Player Profile
 

1996 births
Living people
People from Langevåg
Women's association football goalkeepers
Norwegian women's footballers
Fortuna Ålesund players
Stabæk Fotball Kvinner players
LSK Kvinner FK players
Brighton & Hove Albion W.F.C. players
Toppserien players
Women's Super League players
Norway women's international footballers
2015 FIFA Women's World Cup players
2019 FIFA Women's World Cup players
Norwegian expatriate sportspeople in England
Expatriate women's footballers in England
Sportspeople from Møre og Romsdal
UEFA Women's Euro 2017 players